Jean-Louis Hue (born 22 April 1949, Évreux) is a French journalist and writer.

Biography 
Hue studied law and journalism. A freelancer for the magazines  and Lui, he later was appointed deputy editor-in-chief of the ecological monthly . During the 1980s, he joined Le Magazine Littéraire where he succeeded Jean-Jacques Brochier in 2004 as head of the editorial staff.

Jean-Louis Hue is writer 's father.

Publications 
1982: Le Chat dans tous ses états, Grasset,  (Prix Fénéon)
1987: Dernières nouvelles du Père Noël, in collaboration with Anne-Marie Koenig, Grasset, Prix Goncourt de la nouvelle
2010: L'apprentissage de la marche, Grasset

External links 
 Jean-Louis Hue on Babelio
 L'apprentissage de la marche on Le Point
 Jean-Louis Hue, L'apprentissage de la marche (compte rendu) on Persée

20th-century French journalists
21st-century French journalists
20th-century French writers
21st-century French writers
Prix Fénéon winners
Prix Goncourt de la nouvelle recipients
1949 births
People from Évreux
Living people